Linguistic aesthetics may refer to:
Phonaesthetics
Poetry
Artistic languages
Euphony